Cremnoconchus carinatus is a species of freshwater snail, an aquatic gastropod mollusk in the family Littorinidae, the winkles or periwinkles.

Distribution
This species is endemic to the Western Ghats range, in India.

References

External links

Littorinidae
Gastropods described in 1870